Central Africa Baptist University  is a private christian university located in Kitwe, Zambia.

References

External links 
 

Universities in Zambia